The Western Australia Screen Culture Awards, also known as the WA Screen Culture Awards or WASCAs, acknowledge innovation and contributions in a wide range of screen-related artistic areas, where the work was created in Western Australia or by West Australians.  The awards, launched in 2020, succeed a previous West Australian screen award series, and are presented annually.

Purpose 
The awards recognize outstanding innovation, independent spirit and contributions in the areas of contemporary short, feature and documentary filmmaking, television, computer games, VR, AR, gallery-based moving image, installations, projections and other intersections with screen and moving image forms, created in Western Australia, or by West Australians.

History 
The awards were launched, by the producers of the Revelation Perth International Film Festival, under chairperson Richard Sowada, in 2020. The promoters had support from the Australian and West Australian governments.  They represent a "reimagining" and expansion of the WA Screen Awards, which had been canceled in 2016. The award ceremony has taken place each year at the Luna Cinemas in Leederville.

Trophies 
The first-year trophy was a glass circle with an engraving. In 2021 filmmaker, screen industry advocate and previous WASCA winner, Ryan Hodgson, worked with Geographik, Squarepeg Home and Artcom Fabrication to create new trophies, he stated

Ceremonies

Event format 
The awards night is held annually in December, and the awards are presented by the Revelation International Film Festival, with the first year book-ending the festival when it had to move from its regular spot in July because of the Covid pandemic.

Nominations and winners 
Entry to the awards is, as of 2022, run through an external platform, File Freeway. Entry generally opens in August and closes in October and is open to any project completed within the 12 months prior. The rules state that up to 5 projects will be nominated for each award.

Outstanding Contribution to the Industry

Independent Spirit Award

Innovation Awards 
Winners are shown in yellow shading and bold type.

2020

2021 

Commercial Content and Best Student Film categories were introduced this year.

2022 
This year, the Innovation in Narrative Feature Film category was split into two categories - over and under $1m (AUD) budget. The nominees and awards were:

Outstanding Achievement 
Winners are highlighted with yellow shading and bold type.

2020

2021

2022 
2022 saw the introduction of a split in the Performance category into "Over 18" and "Under 18". The listings are:

References 

Australian awards